The 1977 Rugby League World Cup was the eighth Rugby League World Cup tournament and was held in Australasia, with games played during May and June in both Australia and New Zealand. It featured four teams: Great Britain and France in addition to the two host nations. All teams played each other once, resulting in a top two of Great Britain and Australia who played in the tournament final at the Sydney Cricket Ground with the home team winning by one point.

The tournament was held during the 1977 NSWRFL season and 1977 New Zealand rugby league season. That the final would be between Great Britain and Australia soon became obvious, with France and New Zealand both performing poorly.

Teams

Venues

Matches

Group stage

Final 

After their 19–5 win over Great Britain a week earlier at Lang Park in Brisbane (which actually drew 2,543 more fans than the Final), the Australians went into the Final as warm favourites. However, led by experienced captain Roger Millward, the Lions managed to dominate possession throughout the game, and it took a last minute try from Australian halfback John Kolc (playing his only international game for Australia) to secure the Cup in front of 24,457 spectators at the Sydney Cricket Ground.

1st Half 
The Australian's opened the scoring through Allan McMahon who scored in the Paddington corner. Michael Cronin kicked the sideline conversion and Australia led 5–0. Great Britain soon his back with a try to Steve Pitchford. George Fairbairn converted the try to lock the scores at 5–5. The match was then highlighted by a 60-metre try to Australian centre Russel Gartner who pounced on a dropped ball from Lions fullback Fairbairn after a Great Britain scrum win to race away and score. Only converging defence from Gartner's opposite number Les Dyl kept him from scoring closer to the posts, giving Cronin a difficult conversion from midway between the posts and the touch line. Cronin missed the attempt and the Australian's led 8–5. Fairbairn then kicked a penalty goal to make the scores 8–7 closing in on half time.

Late in the first half the gritty and determined Lions were considered unlucky not to score when they were denied what would have been a certain try to winger Stuart Wright by English referee Billy Thompson. Wright had intercepted a pass from Cronin to Mark Harris 15 metres from the Australian line and was racing downfield with no one near him when Thompson called play back for an obstruction penalty to Great Britain rather than play advantage. Had Wright scored, and likely under the posts, it could have given the visitors a 12–8 lead going into the break. Instead, soon after Cronoin kicked a penalty goal from in front of the posts to make the score 10–7 going into half time.

2nd Half 
Australia took the lead out to 13–7 after a try to John Kolc in the Randwick corner in front of the Bradman Stand. Fairbairn had dropped a downfield kick by Cronin and the ball was pounced upon by Allan McMahon. From acting half, Kolc then dummied which fooled Fairbairn and Bill Francis and he raced away to score in the corner. Cronin missed the difficult kick from the sideline and the score remained at 13–7.

The Lions then hit back with a try under the posts to replacement back Ken Gill which was converted by Fairbairn to bring the scores to 13–12. After Kolc was penalised for using an elbow on Roger Millward who was chasing his own chip-kick, Fairbairn then had a late chance to give Great Britain the lead with a penalty goal from 45 metres out, though his went just to the right of the posts into the waiting arms of Australian fullback Graham Eadie who took full advantage of the Lions defence line still being near halfway to run the ball back outside the Australian quarter line.

Try scorers 
4

  Graham Eadie
  Allan McMahon

3

  Roger Millward
  Stuart Wright

2

  Jean-Jacques Cologni
  Kevin Fisher
  John Smith

1

  Denis Fitzgerald
  Russel Gartner
  Mark Harris
  John Kolc
  John Peard
  Terry Randall
  Mark Thomas
  Greg Veivers
  Jacques Guigue
  Christian Laskawiec
  Joël Roosebrouck
  Eddie Bowman
  Les Dyl
  Ken Gill
  Phil Hogan
  George Nicholls
  Steve Pitchford
  Mark Graham
  Chris Jordan
  Alan Rushton
  John Whittaker

References

External links 
 1977 World Cup at rlhalloffame.org.uk
 1977 World Cup at rugbyleagueproject.com
 1977 World Cup data at hunterlink.net.au
 1977 World Cup at 188-rugby-league.co.uk